The following lists events that happened during 2020 in the Republic of Palau.

Incumbents 

 President: Thomas Remengesau Jr.
 Vice President: Raynold Oilouch

Events 
Ongoing – COVID-19 pandemic in Oceania

February 
 February 1 – All charter flights from China, Macau, and Hong Kong were suspended by President Thomas Remengesau Jr. in an executive order until February 29. The order also quarantined all non-citizens who recently entered the country for fourteen days. Schools were also shut starting in April and Remengesau eventually suspended travel to the country.

September 
 September 4 – It was revealed that the country urged the U.S. to build joint-use military facilities in the country, a move seen as a push back against Chinese influence in the Pacific. President Tommy Remengesau Jr. made the request in a letter to U.S. Secretary of Defense Mark Esper, who visited the island last week.
 September 14 – President Tommy Remengesau Jr. announced that he will be hosting an in-person meeting with the leaders of Kiribati, Nauru, the Federated States of Micronesia and the Marshall Islands, with Nauru's president saying the leaders agreed to attend the country's Independence Day on October 1 as the five Pacific countries remain free of COVID-19.

Deaths 
 October 14 – Kuniwo Nakamura, President of Palau (1993–2001), in Koror (b. 1943)

References 

 
Years of the 21st century in Palau
2020s in Palau
Palau
Palau